Valeriy Brezdenyuk (June 17, 1963 – February 18, 2014) was a Ukrainian painter from Zhmerynka, Vinnytska Oblast, practicing paper marbling. He was killed in action during Euromaidan.

Brezdenyuk was an entrepreneur and owner of an internet cafe in the center of Zhmerynka. He was a painter practicing paper marbling Turkish ebru style. In 2013, Brezdenyuk was a finalist on "Ukraine's Got Talent" after winning his hometown's "Zhmerynka's got talent" contest.

He died on February 18, 2014, in Kyiv during the Euromaidan clashes with the police. He was shot in the back. Valeriy Brezdenyuk entered "UDAR" party in a few months before his death and has been its active participant.

References 

20th-century Ukrainian painters
20th-century Ukrainian male artists
21st-century Ukrainian painters
21st-century Ukrainian male artists
People from Zhmerynka
1963 births
2014 deaths
People of the Euromaidan
Ukrainian male painters
Recipients of the Order of Gold Star (Ukraine)